This is a list of middle schools in Central Virginia. Any school that is included in this list must meet the following criteria
In Goochland, Hanover, Chesterfield, Henrico, the City of Richmond, Amelia, or any other parts of the Richmond metro area.
labeled middle school, intermediate school, or junior high school in title.
Middle schools in Central Virginia follow state and their respective counties laws. In this area the public middle schools normally have people that are from 6th to 8th grade. The middle schools are less common in counties than elementary schools because they have bigger facilities and combine more people than an elementary school. Private middle schools are sometimes religious (like Catholic schools) and are rarely a so-called "boarding school".

Henrico County

Public

Private
Mt. Vernon Middle School

City of Richmond

Public

Chesterfield County

Public

Goochland County

Public

Hanover County

Public

City of Petersburg

Public

Colonial Heights

Public

Amelia County

Public

Caroline County

Public

Charles City County

Cumberland County

Dinwiddie County

King William County

References
Henrico County Public Schools Official Website
Hill middle school's establishment date
Thompson middle school's establishment date
Binford middle school's establishment date
Boushall middle school's establishment date
Brown middle school's establishment date
Elkhardt middle schools's establishment date
Henderson middle school's establishment date
King middle school's establishment date

 Citations

Middle
Central
Greater Richmond Region
Virginia